SSF may refer to:

Gaming
Saturn Sound Format, a Sega Saturn-specific implementation of the Portable Sound Format
Super Smash Flash (series), a series of fan-made games based on the Super Smash Bros. series
Super Street Fighter (disambiguation), various Capcom fighting games

Organizations
Saudi Special Forces
Schweizer Sportfernsehen, a Swiss private TV broadcaster specialized in sport events
Shakespeare Schools Foundation
Singapore Sailing Federation
Skysurfer Strike Force
Society of Saint Francis
Soul Sonic Force
South Sea Fleet
Special Security Force, a unit of the government of Bangladesh
Samajtantrik Sramik Front, a trade union federation in Bangladesh
Special Service Force, a former brigade of the Canadian Forces
Sunni Students' Federation, an Indian Sunni muslim students' organisation.
Svenska Scoutförbundet, a Swedish guide and scout association
Sacred sales force

Other uses
Semi-solid forming, a casting method utilizing metal that is 50% liquid
Shortest seek first, in computers
Single-stock futures
South San Francisco, a city in California, United States
Space Station Freedom
Small shelly fauna, enigmatic early fossils